Ikoma may refer to:
 Mount Ikoma in Nara Prefecture, Japan
 Ikoma (ethnic group) an ethnic group of Tanzania
 Ikoma, Nara, a city in Nara Prefecture, Japan
 Ikoma Station, a station in Ikoma City, Japan
 Ikoma clan, a Japanese clan
 Japanese cruiser Ikoma, an armored cruiser of the Imperial Japanese Navy
 Japanese aircraft carrier Ikoma, an aircraft carrier of the Imperial Japanese Navy

People with the surname
, Japanese footballer

Japanese-language surnames